This page details statistics, records, and other achievements pertaining to Babe Ruth. At the time in which Babe Ruth played, some of baseball's modern awards did not exist. The Division Series and League Championship Series did not exist. The MLB All-Star Game did not exist until 1933, late in Ruth's career. At the time of his retirement, Ruth held many of baseball's most esteemed records, including the career records for home runs (714 — since broken), slugging percentage (0.690), runs batted in (2,213 — since broken), bases on balls (2,062 — since broken) and on-base plus slugging (1.164). At the time of his retirement, Ruth held many more records than are listed here.

Achievements
 First batter to hit 30 home runs in one season (during the 1920 season)
 First batter to hit 40 home runs in one season (during the 1920 season)
 First batter to hit 50 home runs in a season (54 in 1920)
 First batter to hit 60 homers in a season (60 in 1927)
 First batter to hit 500 homers in a career (August 11, 1929)
 2× All-Star (1933, 1934)
 7× World Series champion
 1923 AL MVP
 12× AL home run champion (1918, 1919, 1920, 1921, 1923, 1924, 1926, 1927, 1928, 1929, 1930, 1931)
 6× AL RBI champion (1919, 1920, 1921, 1923, 1926, 1928)
 AL batting champion (1924)
 AL ERA champion (1916)
Pitched a combined no-hitter on June 23, 1917
 New York Yankees #3 retired
 Major League Baseball All-Century Team
 Major League Baseball All-Time Team
 National Baseball Hall of Fame Class of 1936 (inaugural)
 Ranked #1 on The Sporting News list of "Baseball's 100 Greatest Players" (1998)
 Ranked #2 by ''ESPN SportsCenturys Top North American Athletes of the 20th Century
 Ranked #1 by The Baltimore Sun in 2012 as the Greatest Maryland Athlete of all time
 Named the DHL Hometown Heroes greatest New York Yankee ever in 2006

All-time ranks
 1st on all-time slugging % with 0.690
 1st on all-time OPS with 1.164
 1st on all-time OPS+ with 206
 2nd on all-time on-base % list with .474
 2nd on all-time At bats per home run list with 11.76
 3rd on all-time RBI list with 2,213
 3rd on all-time home run list with 714
 3rd on all-time bases on balls list with 2,062
 4th on all-time runs list with 2,174 (Tied with Hank Aaron)
 7th on all-time total bases list with 5,793
 9th on all-time batting average list with .342 (Tied with Dan Brothers)

Major League records

Regular seasonSlugging percentage, career: 0.690Slugging percentage, season: 0.847 (1920)
Broken by Barry Bonds, 0.863 (2001)On-base percentage, career: .474
Broken by Ted Williams in the 1946 season (finished career with .482)On-base plus slugging, career: 1.164On-base plus slugging, season: 1.379 (1920)
Broken by Barry Bonds, 1.381 (2002)Home runs, career: 714 (708 in AL, 6 in NL)
Broken by Hank Aaron on April 8, 1974Home runs, season: 60 (1927)
Broken by Roger Maris on October 1, 1961At bats per home run, career: 11.76
Broken by Mark McGwire in 1998 (finished career with 10.61)At bats per home run, season: 8.48 (1920)
Broken by Mark McGwire, 8.13 (1996)Most times hitting two or more home runs in a game, career: 72 (71 in AL, 1 in NL)Longest Home run: 575 feet (July 18, 1921)Runs batted in, career: 2,213 (2,201 in AL, 12 in NL)
Broken by Hank Aaron on May 10, 1975Bases on balls, career: 2,062 (2,042 in AL, 20 in NL)
Broken by Rickey Henderson on April 25, 2001No-hitter: Boston Red Sox 4, Washington Senators 0, June 23, 1917
First game of a doubleheader. Ruth and his catcher, Pinch Thomas, were ejected for arguing balls and strikes after walking the first batter, who was then caught stealing. Ernie Shore came on in relief and retired the next 26 in a row for a no-hitter, completely in relief. Catcher Sam Agnew caught for Shore.Lowest ratio of hits per nine innings pitched for a left-handed pitcher: 7.1774
Broken by Sandy Koufax, 6.7916Highest Winning Percentage for a left-handed pitcher: 67.14%
Broken by Lefty Grove, 68.03%

American League records

Regular season

Slugging percentageSlugging percentage, career: 0.673Slugging percentage, season: 0.847 (1920)Slugging percentage by a lefthander, season: 0.847 (1920)Seasons leading the league in slugging percentage: 13 (1918–1924, 1926–1931)

RunsRuns, season: 177 (152 games, 1921)Runs by a lefthander, season: 177 (152 games, 1921)Seasons leading the league in runs: 8 (1919–1921, 1923, 1924, 1926–1928)Consecutive seasons leading the league in runs: Three, twice
Three (1919–1921)
Three (1926–1928)
Also achieved by Ty Cobb (1909–1911), Eddie Collins (1912–1914), Ted Williams (1940–1942), and Mickey Mantle (1956–1958)Seasons with 150 or more runs: 6 (1920, 1921, 1923, 1927, 1928, 1930)

DoublesDoubles by pitcher, game: 3, at Washington Senators, May 9, 1918 (20 innings)

Home runsHome runs, career: 714Home runs with one club, career: 659, New York Yankees (1920–1934)Home runs by lefthander, career: 714Home runs at home by lefthander, season: 32 (1921)
Tied by Ken Williams in 1922Home runs on road, season: 32 (1927)Home runs on road by lefthander, season: 32 (1927)Seasons hitting home runs in all parks, career: 11 (1919–1921, 1923, 1924, 1926–1931)Seasons with 50 or more home runs: 4 (1920, 1921, 1927, 1928)Consecutive seasons with 50 or more home runs: Two, twice
Two (1920–1921)
Two (1927–1928)
Tied by Ken Griffey Jr. (1997–1998) and Alex Rodriguez (2001–2002)Seasons with 40 or more home runs: 11 (1920, 1921, 1923, 1924, 1926–1932)Consecutive seasons with 40 or more home runs: 7 (1926–1932)Seasons with 30 or more home runs: 13 (1920–1924, 1926–1933)Seasons with 20 or more home runs: 16 (1919–1934)
Tied by Ted Williams (1939–1942, 1946–1951, 1954–1958, 1960) and Reggie Jackson (1968–1980, 1982, 1984, 1985)Consecutive seasons with 20 or more home runs: 16 (1919–1934)Home runs, two consecutive seasons: 114 (60 in 1927, 54 in 1928)Home runs by lefthander, two consecutive seasons: 114 (60 in 1927, 54 in 1928)Home runs by lefthander, one month: 17 (September 1927)Home runs in June: 15 (1930)
Tied by Bob Johnson in 1934 and Roger Maris in 1961Home runs through July 31: 41 (1928)
Tied by Jimmie Foxx in 1932Home runs in September: 17 (1927)
Tied by Albert Belle in 1995Home runs through September 30: 60 (1927)
Tied by Roger Maris in 1961Most times hitting three home runs in a doubleheader, career (homering in both games): 7 (1920, 1922, 1926, 1927, 1930, 1933 )Most times hitting two or more home runs in a game, career: 71Home runs, two consecutive days: 6, May 21, 1930—May 22, 1930
Ruth played four games over the two-day stretch and did not homer in one of the games.
Tied by Tony Lazzeri (May 23–24, 1936)

Grand slamsGrand slams, two consecutive games (homering in each game): 2, twice
2, September 27, 1927—September 29, 1927
2, August 6, 1929 (second game)—August 7, 1929 (first game)
Several other players have achieved this once; only Ruth has achieved it twice.

Total basesTotal bases, season: 457 (152 games in 1921)Total bases by lefthander, season: 457 (152 games in 1921)Seasons leading the league in total bases: 6 (1919, 1921, 1923, 1924, 1926, 1928)
Tied with Ty Cobb (1907–1909, 1911, 1915, 1917) and Ted Williams (1939, 1942, 1946, 1947, 1949, 1951)Total bases by pitcher, game: 10, at Washington Senators, May 9, 1918 (10 innings)
1 single, 3 doubles, 1 triple
Tied with Snake Wiltse, Red Ruffing and Jack Harshman

Extra-base hitsExtra-base hits, career: 1,350 (506 doubles, 136 triples, 708 HR)Extra-base hits, season: 119 (1921)
44 doubles, 16 triples, 59 HRExtra-base hits by lefthander, season: 119 (1921)
44 doubles, 16 triples, 59 HRSeasons leading the league in extra-base hits: 7 (1918–1921, 1923, 1924, 1928)Consecutive seasons leading the league in extra-base hits: 4 (1918–1921)Extra-base hits by pitcher, game: 4, at Washington Senators, May 9, 1918, (10 innings)
3 doubles, 1 triple
Tied with Snake Wiltse, who achieved the feat in 9 inning

Runs batted inRuns batted in, career: 2,202Seasons leading the league in runs batted in: 6 (1919–1921, 1923, 1926, 1928)
Ruth tied for the league lead in 1928Consecutive seasons leading the league in runs batted in: 3 (1919–1921)
Tied with Ty Cobb (1907–1909) and Cecil Fielder (1990–1992)Consecutive seasons with 150 or more runs batted in: 3 (1929–1931)Seasons with 100 or more runs batted in: 13 (1919–1921, 1923, 1924, 1926–1933)
Broken by Alex Rodriguez in 2010

Bases on ballsBases on balls, career: 2,042Bases on balls, season: 170 (152 games in 1923)Bases on balls by lefthander, season: 170 (152 games in 1923)Seasons leading the league in bases on balls: 11 (1920, 1921, 1923, 1924, 1926–1928, 1930–1933)Consecutive seasons leading the league in bases on balls: 4 (1930–1933)
Tied by Ted Williams (1946–1949)Seasons with 100 or more bases on balls: 13 (1919–1921, 1923, 1924, 1926–1928, 1930–1934)

Set with Lou GehrigTwo teammates with 40 or more home runs, season: Thrice
1927 (Ruth 60, Lou Gehrig 47)
1930 (Ruth 49, Gehrig 41)
1931 (Ruth 46, Gehrig 46)
Achieved by several other pairs of teammates since.  Ruth and Gehrig were the first, and the only to achieve it three times.Clubs with three consecutive home runs in inning: Twice
4th inning, at Philadelphia Athletics, first game, September 10, 1925 (Bob Meusel, Ruth, Gehrig)
7th inning, at Chicago White Sox, May 4, 1929 (Ruth, Gehrig, Meusel)

ShutoutsShutouts won or tied by lefthander, season: 9 (1916)
Tied by Ron Guidry in 1978

All-Star Game recordsPlate appearances, inning: 2, 5th inning, July 10, 1934
Tied with Lou Gehrig (5th inning, July 10, 1934) and Jim Rice (3rd inning, July 6, 1983)First home run in All-Star Game history: 1 on, off Bill Hallahan, 3rd inning, July 6, 1933

World Series records
At the time of his retirement, Ruth held the World Series career records for series played (10), runs (37), home runs (15), total bases (96), slugging percentage (0.744), extra-base hits (22), bases on balls (33), strikeouts (30), and earned run average (0.87).Most positions played, career: 4 (pitcher, left field, right field, first base)
Tied by Jackie Robinson (1B, 2B, LF, 3B), Elston Howard (LF, RF, 1B, C), Tony Kubek (LF, 3B, CF, SS), and Pete Rose (RF, LF, 3B, 1B)Series batting .300 or over: 6 (1921, 1923, 1926, 1927, 1928, 1932)Runs, 4-game series: 9 (1928)
Tied by Lou Gehrig (1932)Runs, game: 4, at St. Louis Cardinals, October 6, 1926
Achieved by several other players since; Ruth was the first to achieve this.Consecutive games scoring one or more runs, career: 9 (1927 , 1928 , 1932 )Hits, 4-game series: 10 (1928)Most times reached first base safely, game (batting 1.000): 5, twice
5, at St. Louis Cardinals, October 6, 1926 (3 HR, 2 BB)
5, vs. St. Louis Cardinals, October 10, 1926 (1 HR, 4 BB)
Achieved by several players since then; only Ruth has achieved it twice.Home runs, 7-game series: 4 (1926)
Tied by Duke Snider (1952, 1956), Hank Bauer (1958), Gene Tenace (1972) and Barry Bonds (2002)Series with three or more home runs: 3 (1923 , 1926 , 1928 )
Tied by Mickey Mantle (1956 , 1960 , 1964 )Series with two or more home runs in a game: 4 (1923, 1926, 1928, 1932)
2 HR in 1 game twice, 3 HR in 1 game twiceMost home runs, three consecutive series (three consecutive years): 9 (1926 , 1927 , 1928 )Home runs, game: 3, twice
3, at St. Louis Cardinals, October 6, 1926 (2 consecutive)
3, at St. Louis Cardinals, October 9, 1928 (2 consecutive)
Ruth is the only player to achieve this twice.
Tied by Reggie Jackson (October 18, 1977 vs. Los Angeles Dodgers — each on 1st pitch), Albert Pujols (October 22, 2011 at Texas Rangers), and Pablo Sandoval (October 24, 2012 vs. Detroit Tigers)
Ruth also homered twice in a World Series game on two occasions (October 11, 1923 and October 1, 1932)Home runs, two consecutive innings: 2, twice
2, 4th and 5th innings, at New York Giants, October 11, 1923
2, 7th and 8th innings, at St. Louis Cardinals, October 9, 1928
Ruth was the first to achieve this.  It was next achieved by Ted Kluszewski on October 1, 1959.
Several other players have achieved this since; only Ruth has achieved it twice.Total bases, 4-game series: 22 (1928)Total bases, game: 12, twice
12, at St. Louis Cardinals, October 6, 1926 (3 HR)
12, at St. Louis Cardinals, October 9, 1928 (3 HR)
Also achieved by Reggie Jackson on October 18, 1977 (3 HR vs. Los Angeles Dodgers)
Broken by Albert Pujols on October 22, 2011 (3 HR, 2 singles at Texas Rangers)Extra-base hits, 4-game series: 6 (1928)Bases on balls, game: 4, vs. St. Louis Cardinals, October 10, 1926
Tied with Fred Clarke (Pittsburgh Pirates, October 16, 1909), Doug DeCinces (Baltimore Orioles, October 13, 1979), Dick Hoblitzell (Boston Red Sox, October 9, 1916, 14 innings), Ross Youngs (New York Giants, October 10, 1924, 12 innings), and Jackie Robinson (Brooklyn Dodgers, October 5, 1952, 11 innings)Stolen bases, inning: 2, 5th inning, vs. New York Giants, October 6, 1921
Tied with several other playersInnings pitched, game: 14, vs. Brooklyn Dodgers, October 9, 1916
Ruth pitched a complete game victory (won game 2–1)Consecutive Scoreless Innings Pitched: 29 2/3 Innings

Broken by Whitey Ford October 8, 1961

References

Ruth, Babe
 Career achievements of Babe Ruth
New York City sports-related lists